The 1913 Cork Intermediate Hurling Championship was the fifth staging of the Cork Intermediate Hurling Championship since its establishment by the Cork County Board.

Redmonds won the championship following a 5-3 to 1-0 defeat of Cloyne in the final.

Results

Final

References

Cork Intermediate Hurling Championship
Cork Intermediate Hurling Championship